Agriopis is a genus of moths in the family Geometridae erected by Jacob Hübner in 1825.

Species
 Agriopis aurantiaria (Hübner, 1799) – scarce umber
 Agriopis bajaria (Denis & Schiffermüller, 1775)
 Agriopis beschkovi Ganev, 1987
 Agriopis dira (Butler, 1878)
 Agriopis erectaria (Püngeler, 1908)
 Agriopis japonensis (Warren, 1894)
 Agriopis leucophaearia (Denis & Schiffermüller, 1775) – spring usher
 Agriopis marginaria (Fabricius, 1776) – dotted border

References

External links

Bistonini
Geometridae genera
Taxa named by Jacob Hübner